The Christ Church (or Christuskirche) is a historic landmark and Lutheran church in Windhoek, Namibia, belonging to the German-speaking Evangelical Lutheran Church in Namibia. It was designed by architect Gottlieb Redecker.

The church was built following the wars between the Germans and the Khoikhoi, Herero, and Owambo. The foundation stone was laid on 11 August 1907, while on 16 October 1910 the church was officially dedicated. It was originally known as the Church of Peace.

Christ Church was constructed from quartz sandstone mined from the vicinity of Avis Dam. It has a mixture of neo-Romanesque, Art Nouveau and Gothic revival influences.

The portico was made from Carrara marble imported from Italy. The clock and part of the roof was shipped from Germany, as were the three bronze bells cast by Franz Schilling. They bear the inscriptions "Ehre sei Gott in der Höhe" (Glory to God in the highest), "Friede auf Erden" (Peace on earth), and "Den Menschen ein Wohlgefallen" (Goodwill towards men). During a confirmation service in the 1960 the clapper of the main bell came loose, smashed through the window and fell on the street. Window bars were installed in reaction to this.

The colorful stained lead glass windows in the sanctuary were a gift from Emperor Wilhelm II. In the late 1990s a tourist noticed that all of them were installed with the sun protection on the inside. In the two years following this discovery, all window elements were restored and turned around.

The church is located on a traffic island on Robert Mugabe Avenue, opposite the Tintenpalast.

References

Windhoek ChristChurch
Windhoek ChristChurch
Buildings and structures in Windhoek
German-Namibian culture
Windhoek ChristChurch
Windhoek ChristChurch
Romanesque Revival church buildings in Namibia
Gothic Revival church buildings in Namibia